Marc Harold Wolff (born 25 August 1947) is a well-known American helicopter stunt pilot.

Early life
He grew up and went to school in New Jersey.

Career

Feature films
He has worked on many action films as an aerial coordinator, working on over 170 films. He worked on his first film in 1974. On films, he works with the second unit. Where an aerial sequence (often found in action and science-fiction films) is required, he coordinates the aerial shot from a helicopter.

Flying Pictures
He works with Flying Pictures of the UK, based at the former RAF Chilbolton in the Test Valley district of western Hampshire. Flying Pictures claims to be the world leader in aerial & helicopter filming services for feature films.

In the 2012 Summer Olympics opening ceremony, he flew the helicopter for the section flying along the River Thames, next to Big Ben, entitled Isles of Wonder, also known as Journey along the Thames. He also flew the helicopter for the pre-recorded sequence known as Happy and Glorious, flying it straight through Tower Bridge, with camerawork by John Marzano. The sequence ended with an AgustaWestland AW139 flying above the Olympic Stadium, with the Queen portrayed by Julia McKenzie, who appeared to parachute from the helicopter; he piloted this helicopter above the Olympic Stadium. The two parachutists were Mark Sutton (James Bond) and Gary Connery (Queen). A similar helicopter is seen at the end of Skyfall, which he had helped to film the aerial sequences.

Personal life
He has lived in Mougins in south-east France since 2001, with his wife and son and daughter. He lived in Cornwall previously for many years, where his children were born.

Filmography
 For Your Eyes Only (1982), opening sequence at Beckton Gas Works on 3 November 1980
 Biggles (1986)
 Black Hawk Down (2001)
 Skyfall (2012)

References

External links
 Interview
 Flying Pictures

1947 births
American stunt performers
Stunt pilots
Helicopter pilots
People from Alpes-Maritimes
Living people